JJ Hones (born December 10, 1987) is a former Stanford Cardinal women's basketball player.

Born in La Jolla, California, Hones is the daughter of Susan and Dan Hones and now resides in Beaverton, Oregon. Her younger sister, Kelsey plays soccer for the Oregon Ducks.

Honed won two state titles in basketball for Southridge High School in Beaverton, OR.

References

External links

JJ Hones: Stanford Player Bio

1987 births
Living people
Parade High School All-Americans (girls' basketball)
Sportspeople from Beaverton, Oregon
Basketball players from San Diego
Stanford Cardinal women's basketball players